Luigi Mostacci (1934–2003) was an Italian pianist.

Mostacci was born in Tripoli, Libya.  He performed internationally, and taught at the Palermo, Pesaro and Bologna conservatories. He was a Counselor at the Teatro Comunale di Bologna's artistic commission, the artistic director of Bologna's Amici della Musica association and the founder of the Senigallia Competition.  He died in Bologna
.

References
 Vivere Senigallia
 
 Maria Canals Competition
   Alink-Argerich Foundation.

1934 births
2003 deaths
People from Tripoli, Libya
Italian classical pianists
Male classical pianists
Italian male pianists
20th-century classical pianists
20th-century Italian musicians
20th-century Italian male musicians
Libyan people of Italian descent